Pasha Group is a privately held American shipping company with its headquarters in San Rafael, California. It has automobile shipping terminals at the US East Coast in Baltimore, Maryland; and the West Coast at Aberdeen, Washington (Port of Grays Harbor), and National City, California (Port of San Diego). The company announced it would reopen the Port of San Francisco's Pier 80 in for automobiles in 2018. It was established in 1942 or in 1947 as Pasha Truckaway.

Pasha Hawaii operates shipping line including the $100 million roll-on/roll-off automobile transporter M/V Jean Anne, launched in 2005, and homeported in San Diego; and $144 million M/V Marjorie C, a combined roll-on/roll-off and 1,500 TEU containerized cargo ship, launched in 2014.

References

External links

American companies established in 1947
Shipping companies of the United States